Charkheda Khurd railway station is a small railway station in Khandwa district, Madhya Pradesh. Its code is CKKD. It serves Charkheda Khurd village. The station consists of two platforms. The platforms are not well sheltered. It lacks many facilities including water and sanitation.

References

Railway stations in Khandwa district
Bhopal railway division